Mighty Oaks may refer to: 

 SUNY-ESF Mighty Oaks, collegiate sports teams, Syracuse, New York
 Mighty Oaks (band), indie and folk band from Berlin, Germany, founded in 2010
 Mighty Oak Brewery, brewery in Maldon, Essex, UK
 Mighty Oak (film), a 2020 American film

See also
 From Mighty Oaks, record album by Ray Thomas